William Christian Bullitt Jr. (January 25, 1891 – February 15, 1967) was an American diplomat, journalist, and novelist. He is known for his special mission to negotiate with Lenin on behalf of the Paris Peace Conference, often recalled as a missed opportunity to normalize relations with the Bolsheviks. He was also the first U.S. ambassador to the Soviet Union and the U.S. ambassador to France during World War II. In his youth, he was considered a radical, but he later became an outspoken anticommunist.

Early years
Bullitt was born to a prominent Philadelphia family, the son of Louisa Gross (née Horwitz) and William Christian Bullitt Sr. His grandfather was John Christian Bullitt, founder of the law firm today known as Drinker Biddle & Reath. His family was of French descent. His ancestor Joseph Boulet, a Huguenot, had fled Nîmes in 1629. 

Bullitt's upbringing was cosmopolitan. Members of his family lived in the main European capitals, and he learned French and German at a very young age. 

He graduated from Yale University in 1912, after having been voted "most brilliant" in his class. He briefly attended Harvard Law School but dropped out on the death of his father in 1914. At Yale, he was a member of Scroll and Key. In 1914, Bullitt was travelling though Russia with his mother and was in Moscow on 28 July 1914 when the Austrian empire declared war on Serbia, provoking pro-Serb demonstrations on the streets. Bullitt took the last train from Moscow to Berlin and left Russia very shorty before Germany declared war on Russia on 1 August 1914. Upon his return to America, Bullitt worked as a journalist for the Philadelphia Ledger and become the deputy editor of the paper in 1915. In December 1915, in a publicity stunt, Henry Ford chartered an ocean liner, which he called the "peace ship" and sailed to Europe with the intention of mediating an end to the First World War. Bullitt was one of the journalists abroad the "peace ship" and he filed satirical reports from the ship about the resulting media circus, which stressed the absurdity of Ford's voyage, which were published on the front pages of various American newspapers.    

He married socialite Aimee Ernesta Drinker (1892-1981) in 1916. Drinker was a renowned beauty from one of Philadelphia's wealthiest families who turned down 50 marriage proposals from 50 different men before she decided to accept Bullitt's marriage proposal. The Drinker family had arrived in the newly founded colony of Pennsylvania in 1670 as one of the first English settlers, and had an quasi-aristocratic position in Philadelphia's social life. The couple took their honeymoon in May 1916 in Germany, the Austrian empire and German-occupied Belgium, where Bullitt interviewed various German and Austrian leaders for the Philadelphia Ledger. The Bullitts were described by the Russian historian Alexander Etkind as a "socially progressive, but culturally conservative" couple who greatly admired the welfare state of Imperial Germany, which preserved the rule of the traditional elites while providing sufficient care for the poor to apparently end the possibility of a revolution. In September 1916, Bullitt took a guided tour of the Eastern Front, where he wrote admiringly of the German Army. Bullitt interviewed the industrialist Walther Rathenau who told him that Germany might give Constantinople to the Russians as compensation for German annexations of other parts of the Russian empire. When Bullitt objected that the Ottomans would be opposed to the loss of their capital, Rathenau cynically replied: "We would only have to publish full accounts of the Armenian massacres, and German public opinion would be so incensed that we could drop the Turks as allies".  Bullitt came to dislike the censorship and the overbearing behavior of the German officials as Ernesta wrote in her diary: "Billy says the Germans are the most moral people in the world when it comes to dealing with Germans and the most immoral in their dealings with the rest of the world".

In February 1917, Bullitt interviewed "Colonel" Edward M. House, a man who had no official position in the administration of President Woodrow Wilson, but was the president's closest friend and adviser. Both House and Bullitt belonged to the progressive wing of the Democratic party, and found that they had much in common. House served as Bullitt's mentor in politics and introduced him to both Wilson and later to Franklin D. Roosevelt. Ernesta gave birth to a son in 1917, who died two days later.

Diplomatic career
Working for President Woodrow Wilson at the 1919 Paris Peace Conference, Bullitt was a strong supporter of legalistic internationalism, which was later known as Wilsonianism.

Bullitt Mission of 1919
Prior to the negotiation of the Treaty of Versailles, Bullitt, along with journalist Lincoln Steffens and Swedish communist Karl Kilbom, undertook a special mission to Soviet Russia to negotiate diplomatic relations between the United States and the Bolshevik regime. It was authorized by Wilson advisor Edward M. House. On March 14, Bullitt received a Soviet proposal that demanded that the Allies agree to a peace summit on the Russian Civil War in which they had been participating. The proposed terms for discussion included the lifting of the Allied blockade on the country, the withdrawal of foreign troops from Russia, the disarmament of the warring Russian factions, and a commitment by the Bolshevik government to honor Russia’s financial obligations to the Allies (the second time that the Soviets promised to honor the Tsarist debt in writing).

The Allied leaders rejected these terms, however, apparently convinced that the White forces would be victorious. British Prime Minister David Lloyd George had given early support to the Bullitt Commission, but he refused to make its findings known to the public. He told Bullitt that was because of pressure by Winston Churchill, who was an ardent anticommunist. Bullitt and Steffens returned from Moscow alongside the British writer and spy Arthur Ransome who worked as a double agent for both MI6 and the Cheka. Ransome-who publicly supported the Bolsheviks-served as Bullitt's guide to Russia.

Having failed to convince the leadership to support the establishment of relations with the Bolshevik government, Bullitt resigned from Wilson's staff. On May 17, 1919, Bullitt publicly resigned from the American peace commission in Paris after he read the terms of the Treaty of Versailles. In an open letter to Wilson, he condemned the peace as a tragic mockery of the principle of self-determination. He later returned to the United States and testified in the Senate against the Treaty of Versailles. He also had his report of his Russian trip placed into the record. Margaret MacMillan describes both Bullitt and Steffens as "useful idiots" who were swindled by Lenin into Western abandonment of the White Russian factions. Most historians, however, consider Lenin's peace offer to be a genuine effort to end the war that threatened his regime. Stephen M. Walt called it a "lost opportunity" for the Allies to obtain better terms from the Soviets than they ultimately did.

It's Not Done in Istanbul and marriage to Louise Bryant 
After leaving his job at the Department of State, Bullitt became managing editor of film stories at Paramount. Bullitt's dramatic appearance before the Senate Foreign Relations Committee in 1919 where he denounced Wilson and the Treaty of Versailles led him to become a pariah within the Democratic Party, and only his friendship with Roosevelt who was elected governor of New York in 1928 prevented him from becoming an irrelevance. Bullitt became a foreign correspondent in Europe and later a novelist.  In 1921, he met Louise Bryant and accompanied her the next year in her journalistic travels in Europe. In early 1923, they moved to Istanbul where they were settled in a historical villa overlooking Bosporus on the Asian side of the city that remained from the influential 18th century Köprülü family. ‌Being still legally married to Aimee Drinker, he introduced Louise Bryant as his niece. Later in 1923, Bullitt divorced Drinker. Bullitt's friend, George F. Kennan, wrote about him in 1972: "I see Bill Bullitt, in retrospect, as a member of that remarkable group of young Americans...for whom the First World War was the great electrifying experience of life. They were a striking generation, full of talent and exuberance, determined—if one may put it so—to make life come alive. The mark they made on American culture will be there when many other marks have faded." Bryant was the famous journalist author of Six Red Months in Russia and widow of radical journalist John Reed

In Istanbul, Bryant covered the Turkish War of Independence for the International News Service, while Bullitt worked on his novel, It's Not Done (published in 1926), and dedicated it to Bryant. Bullitt adopted a boy who had lost his father in the Balkan Wars and took him to the US. In February 1924, Bryant gave birth to a daughter, Anne, whose father was Bullitt. Shortly afterwards, Bullitt and Bryant were secretly married in Istanbul with the marriage only being revealed to the world in July 1924 when the couple settled in Paris. Many of Bryant's friends were shocked by her change in behavior after she married Bullitt as her biographer, Mary Dearborn, noted that "she had turned her attention from causes to clothes, from politics to parties". Many of Bryant's friends regarded the marriage as a bizarre one as the former militant Communist Bryant embraced the role of a rich man's wife in Paris whose only major concerns were shopping and parties. Much astonishment was expressed at the way that Bullitt had turned Bryant into a "superficial" woman  who was seemingly only interested in wearing the latest fashions of Paris.  What was considered even more strange was Bullitt's extreme idolization of Bryant's second husband, the Communist journalist, John Reed, a man whom Bullitt greatly liked and admired from the time he first met him in 1915. Bullitt was intelligent and wealthy, but he felt much inferior to the macho war correspondent Reed who had covered revolutions in Mexico and Russia. Bullitt was a man much given to doubts about his masculinity and he had a morbid fear of one day suffering from impotence. Bullitt regarded Reed as the man he wanted to be, and he saw marrying his widow as a way of proving his equality or even his superiority over Reed.  Bryant often talked in glowing terms about Reed, a tendency that Bullitt encouraged as he loved to hear his wife praise her second husband. Bullitt seems to have married Bryant largely because she was Reed's widow as he triumphantly wrote in 1923 when he learned that Bryant was pregnant with his child that "the woman who was so important to John Reed and the mother-to-be of the Bullitt heir were one and the same".

In 1926, he published It's Not Done, a satirical novel that lampooned the dying aristocracy of Chesterbridge (Philadelphia) and its life revolving around Rittenhouse Square. The New York Times described the work as "a novel of ideas, whose limitation is that it is a volley, a propaganda novel, directed against a single institution, the American aristocratic ideal, and whose defect is that the smoke does not quite clear away so that one can accurately count the corpses." The comic novel It's Not Done was a bestseller when it was published in 1926 owning to its risqué content. The title of the book was an allusion to the 1863 novel What is to be done? by Nikolay Chernyshevsky. The book reflected Bullitt's cynical attitude towards American democracy, which he depicted as a corrupt sham in It's Not Done. In his novel, he portrayed the United States as being ruled by a secret oligarchy of wealthy families who manipulated the politicians to serve their interests. 

The plot of It's Not Done concerned an young man, John Corsey, from an ultra-wealthy family in Philadelphia who attends Harvard Law School, but drops out and then works as a journalist. Besides for having precisely the same background and backstory as Bullitt, Corsey was similar to Bullitt in terms of personality. Corsey has a passionate romance with the Frenchwoman Nina Michaud, an intellectual and a sculptor, who closely resembles Bryant in terms of appearance and personality. Nina is portrayed as a sensuous type who prefers to sculpt nudes because it allows her to admire the naked bodies of the models she hires. However, at the prompting of his overbearing mother, John abandons Nina to marry Mildred Ashely, a beautiful and "proper" woman from the American upper classes who strongly resembles Bullitt's first wife, Ernesta Drinker. John tells his mother that Nina makes him "happy, happy, happy", but admits that "she's not our kind". Heartbroken, Nina returns to France, and unknown to John, is pregnant with his child. Mildred is both emotionally cold and frigid, gives birth to a son and being married to her after a year causes John to become impotent due to psychological as opposed to physiological reasons. Just like the real Ernesta Drinker, Mildred has an affair with the German ambassador to the United States, Count Johann Heinrich von Bernstorff, and continued to write him even after the United States declared war on Germany in 1917. After years of being unhappy, John meets Nina, and learns he was the father of her illegitimate son, Raoul, a John Reed-like crusading French Communist journalist. The discovery miraculously cures John of his impotence and he joyously has sex with Nina. John divorces Mildred, marries Nina and the book ends with John and Nina bailing their son whom has been imprisoned for inciting a strike. John does not share Raoul's Communist politics, but he rejoins in the irony that his family line will be carried out by a man committed to the destruction of the  capitalist system that has made him into a rich man.. The book was very successful, going though 24 printings within a year of publication.

Friendship with Freud
Bullitt was psychoanalyzed by Sigmund Freud in Vienna in 1926. At the time, Bullitt's marriage to Bryant was collapsing due to his frequent affairs and he was feeling suicidal, leading him to go to Vienna to seek Freud's help. The patient and the analyst became such good friends that they decided to write a book together, a psycho-biographical study of Woodrow Wilson. That was quite exceptional, as Freud very rarely co-operated with other authors. Freud had confessed to Bullitt that he was feeling depressed while Bullitt mentioned to him that he was writing a book about the Paris peace conference of 1919 with every chapter to be devoted to covering one of the principle leaders, all of whom Bullitt had met. Freud offered to help write the chapter on Wilson, which developed into a biography of Wilson.  Bullitt realized the book would sell better if it was marketed as a psychobiography of Wilson co-written by Freud. Freud wanted to work with Bullitt, who had known Wilson well and provided him with first-hand insights into the former president. Freud greatly hated Wilson for his 14 Points, which he blamed for causing the end of his beloved Austrian empire. Bullitt was likewise equally hostile to Wilson, a mentor and friend he had turned against. Out of a shared dislike of Wilson, the two went to work writing their psychobiography.  

Greatly influenced by Freud's theories, Bullitt wrote a novel, The Divine Wisdom, that was considered highly scandalous at the time due to its frank description of sexuality and an incestuous affair between the two main characters. The The Divine Wisdom begins in St. Petersburg in the late 19th century when a wealthy American industrialist, Peter Rives, falls in love with and marries Ursula Dundas, the beautiful daughter of the American ambassador to Russia. The character of Ursula Dundas was a thinly disguised version of Ernesta Drinker, Bullitt's first wife. Rives and Dundas live happily together with Anna, Peter's daughter from his first marriage, but the marriage collapses when Rives discovers his wife has been unfaithful with a British diplomat, whose child she is pregnant with. Peter divorces Ursula, and returns to America with Anna while Ursula raises her son alone. Under the shock of his wife's infidelity, Peter becomes a fanatical Christian whose life mission is to stamp out all immorality in America. David, Ursula's son by her lover, serves in the First World War while Anna serves as a nurse. In Istanbul after the war, David and Anna meet and fall in love, being unaware that David's mother was once married to Anna's father. Even after learning the secret, David and Anna continue their relationship. The couple are legally brother and sister as David's birth certificate lists Peter as his father, but the two cannot bear to be separated, and instead consummate their love. When Rives learns of the relationship, he is enraged and arrives in Istanbul with the intention of killing both of them for what he views as an incestuous affair, even though he is aware that he is not David's father. David and Anna are chased by a gang of ruffians hired by Peter down the streets. The couple flee to the tunnels of Istanbul, discover a room full of treasure, have sex under the statue of Dionysus and uncover the secrets of the Emperor Julian the Apostle. At the novel's climax, David saves Anna from being killed by Peter, but is wounded and dies in Anna's arms. The Divine Wisdom reflected Bullitt's disenchantment with the puritanical atmosphere in 1920s America, symbolized most notably by Prohibition, and his greater comfort in the more relaxed and permissive atmosphere in Europe. The major theme of the novel is the deeply felt love between David and Anna vs. the stern and deranged puritanism of Peter, whom is determined that both should die for what he considers to be incest, which was Bullitt's attack on what he considered to be repressive morality of America.

In 1929, Bullitt filed for divorce when he discovered his wife was having an affair with the painter and sculptor Gwen Le Gallienne, who had agreed to teach Bryant how to paint and sculpt. Bullitt had discovered in Bryant's room several love letters from Le Gallienne. On 24 March 1930, a French court dissolved his marriage to Bryant and awarded him sole custody of their daughter, Anne.  Anne Bullitt never had children. In 1967, she married her fourth husband, U.S. Senator Daniel Brewster. 

In May-June 1932, Bullitt made a lengthy visit to the Soviet Union, where he met the Soviet Foreign Commissar, Maxim Litvinov. Upon his return to America, Bullitt served as a foreign policy adviser for Governor Roosevelt who became the Democratic candidate for presidency that year. Colonel House had decided that Bullitt was one of the few Democrats with sufficient knowledge of foreign affairs to advise Roosevelt, whose background as governor of New York was felt to make him ill-formed about foreign policy. House was an elder statesmen within the Democratic party and he advised Roosevelt to accept Bullitt's services. Bullitt donated a large sum of money to the Roosevelt campaign and on 23 September 1932 received a handwritten thank you letter from Roosevelt. Bullitt first met Roosevelt on 5 October 1932, and quickly become one of his close friends. In November 1932, Roosevelt was elected president and in January 1933, he sent Bullitt on a tour of Europe to contact various European leaders on behalf of the president-elect. Roosevelt was in Warm Springs at the time, and Bullitt used a code to communicate with him. Bullitt was primarily concerned about the problem of European debts to the United States as he met with prime minister Ramsay MacDonald and the chancellor of the exchequer Neville Chamberlain in London; Édouard Herriot and the premier Joseph Paul-Boncour in Paris; and the German Foreign Minister Baron Konstantin von Neurath in Berlin. During his mission, Bullitt wore disguises; rented apartments under his own name, which he failed to live in to confuse any reporters; and rented the apartments he did live under false names. When Bullitt arrived in New York on 16 February 1933, he told a reporter from the New York Times that it was "sheer nonsense" that he been representing Roosevelt.

First U.S. ambassador to the Soviet Union
President Franklin Roosevelt appointed Bullitt the first U.S. ambassador to the Soviet Union, a post that he held from 1933 to 1936. At the time of his appointment, Bullitt was known as a liberal and thought by some to be something of a radical. The Soviets welcomed him as an old friend because of his diplomatic efforts at the Paris Peace Conference. Though Bullitt arrived in the Soviet Union with high hopes for Soviet–American relations, his view of the Soviet leadership soured on closer inspection. By the end of his tenure, he was openly hostile to the Soviet government. 

On 19 July 1935, Bullitt reported to the secretary of state, Cordell Hull, his belief that: "the aim of the Soviet government is, and will remain, to produce world revolution. The leaders of the Soviet Union believe that the first step toward this revolution must be to strengthen the defensive and offensive power of the Soviet Union. They believe within ten years the defense position of the Soviet Union will be absolutely impregnable and that within 15 years the offensive power of the Soviet Union will be sufficient to enable it to consolidate by its assistance any communist government which may be set up in Europe. To maintain peace for the present, to keep the nations of Europe divided, to foster enmity between Japan and the United States, and to gain the blind devotion and obedience of the communists of all countries so that they will ac against their own governments at the behest of the Communist Party in the Kremlin, is the sum of Stalin's policy". Bullitt argued that the chief aim of American diplomacy must be to "...to point out the danger to Europe of the continuation of the Franco-German enmity and to encourage reconciliation between France and Germany". Bullitt concluded: "we should the guard the reputation of Americans for businesslike efficiency, sincerity and straightforwardness. We should never sent a spy to the Soviet Union. There is no weapon at once so disarming and effective in relations with the communists as sheer honesty. They know very little about it".  He would remain an outspoken anticommunist for the rest of his life. Bullitt was recalled after American journalist Donald Day disclosed that he had been involved in illegal exchange of and trading with Torgsin rubles.

During that period, he was briefly engaged to Roosevelt's personal secretary, Missy LeHand. However, she broke off the engagement after a trip to Moscow during which she reportedly discovered him to be having an affair with Olga Lepeshinskaya, a ballet dancer.

The Spring Ball of the Full Moon
On April 24, 1935, he hosted a Spring Festival at Spaso House, his official residence. He instructed his staff to create an event that would surpass every other embassy party in Moscow's history. The decorations included a forest of ten young birch trees in the chandelier room; a dining room table covered with Finnish tulips; a lawn made of chicory grown on wet felt; an aviary made from fishnet filled with pheasants, parakeets, and one hundred zebra finches, on loan from the Moscow Zoo; and a menagerie of several mountain goats, a dozen white roosters, and a baby bear.

The four hundred guests included Foreign Commissar Maxim Litvinov and the Defense Commissar Marshal Kliment Voroshilov; Communist Party luminaries Nikolai Bukharin, Lazar Kaganovich, and Karl Radek; Soviet Marshals Alexander Yegorov, Mikhail Tukhachevsky, and Semyon Budyonny; and the writer Mikhail Bulgakov. The festival lasted until the early hours of the morning. The bear became drunk on champagne given to him by Radek, and in the early morning hours, the zebra finches escaped from the aviary and perched below the ceilings around the house. Bulgakov described the party as "The Spring Ball of the Full Moon" in his novel The Master and Margarita. On October 29, 2010, Ambassador John Beyrle recreated Bullitt's ball with his own Enchanted Ball, dedicated to Bullitt and Bulgakov.

Ambassador to France

Appeaser
Bullitt was posted to France in October 1936 as ambassador. Alongside Joseph Kennedy-who was appointed the American ambassador in London in 1937-Bullitt was intended to serve as Roosevelt's "eyes and ears" in Europe. Both Kennedy and Bullitt were active Democrats who had used their great wealth to donate generously to Democratic candidates and both were close friends of the president, who distrusted the professional diplomats of the State Department. The professional diplomats of the Foreign Service tended to come from the American upper classes, and Roosevelt believed that as a group the professional diplomats were opposed to the New Deal. Both Bullitt and Kennedy had taken part in various ways in the New Deal, making them loyal in Roosevelt's eyes in a way that the State Department was not. Roosevelt appointed both Bullitt and Kennedy to two of the American grand embassies to serve as his personal representatives in Europe in an attempt to by-pass the State Department. Bullitt was one of Roosevelt's favorite foreign policy advisers alongside Sumner Welles. The American historian David Kennedy wrote: "The brash Bullitt and the silky Welles cordially detested one another, but they agreed that the United States must take a more active role in the world and encouraged the same attitude in their chief". 

Fluent in French and an ardent francophile, Bullitt became established in Paris society.  A man of much charm, wit, sophistication,  and erudition, Bullitt was the most popular ambassador in Paris with the French people during the late Troisième République era. The three ambassadors whom French decision-makers spoke to the most were Bullitt; the British ambassador Sir Eric Phipps; and the German ambassador, Count Johannes von Welczeck. Bullitt was easily the best loved of the trio. He rented a château at Chantilly and owned at least 18,000 bottles of French wine. As a close friend of Roosevelt, with whom he had daily telephone conversations, Bullitt was widely regarded as Roosevelt's personal envoy to France and so was much courted by French politicians. In their telephone calls, Bullitt and Roosevelt used a code where they spoke about the baseball teams of Harvard and Yale and the ages of Roosevelt's relatives in case the phone calls were tapped into. The American historian William Kaufmann wrote that Bullitt "established extremely confidential relations with French political and military leaders of all stripes." Kaufmann noted: "Whereas polo equipment for the Red Army, baseball games and zoo parties for Bolshevik functionaries had failed to soothe the Soviet beast, elaborate fetes and a superb chef at the Place de la Concorde brought him the most intimate confidences of high French society". Bullitt very much enjoyed his posting in Paris, which he regarded as the most glamorous city in the world, and drew unfavorable comparisons between life in Moscow (a city that he hated) vs. life in Paris. Alexis St. Léger, the secretary-general of the Quai d'Orsay, told Bullitt upon his arrival that Roosevelt's decision to appoint a close friend as ambassador in Paris had greatly pleased the French. Bullitt was especially close to Léon Blum and Édouard Daladier and had cordial but not friendly relations with Georges Bonnet, whom he mistrusted. Historians have criticized Bullitt for being too influenced by the last person to whom he spoke to and for including too much gossip in his dispatches to Washington. However, Bullitt's dispatches to Washington are one of the main sources of information about French politics in the late Troisième République as many French politicians spoke very frankly to Bullitt about their feelings, interests, fears and concerns, all of which he passed on Washington. Bullitt was so popular in France and such a close friend to so many French politicians that he was known as the "unofficial minister without portfolio" in the French cabinet. As a very good friend of Roosevelt, Bullitt in the words of Kaufmann served "something more than an American ambassador to France. He acted as both a roving emissary, reporting on his experiences in Britain, Germany and Poland, and the informal inspector-general of the Diplomatic Service". On 1 December 1936, Bullitt reported: "Blum lunched with me alone today, and I had the opportunity to repeat to him everything that I had said to Deblos with regard to the absolute determination of the United States to stay out of any wars on the continent of Europe, but out of any engagements or commitments that might possibly lead to our involvement in wars". Bullitt had long believed that the Treaty of Versailles was too harsh on Germany and the only way to save the peace was to revise the international order in favor of Germany. 

When Bonnet was appointed the French ambassador to the United States, Bullitt told Roosevelt: ""I don't think you'll like him. He is extremely intelligent and competent on economic and financial matters, but he's not a man of character. You may remember that he led the French delegation to the London economic conference where he led the attacks against you". Bullitt often spoke with Roosevelt on other issues besides Franco-American relations. In 1937 Bullitt visited Warsaw to ask the Polish Foreign Minister, Colonel Józef Beck, to consider allowing the Free City of Danzig to rejoin Germany. In Berlin, Bullitt met with the Four Year Plan Organization chief Hermann Göring; the German Foreign Minister Baron Konstantin von Neurath; and the Reichsbank president Hjalmar Schacht to declare American support for revisions in the international order in favor of Germany. Bullitt wanted to see the Sudetenland go to Germany; for the Free City of Danzig returned to the Reich and the restoration of the German colonial empire in Africa. During the Second Sino-Japanese War, he favored the appeasement of Japan at the expense of China in order to focus American attention on Europe. In 1937, he advised Roosevelt: "We have large emotional interests in China, small economic interests and no vital interests". Bullitt had gone to Moscow as an advocate of American-Soviet friendship and left Moscow a much disillusioned and embittered man. Kaufmann wrote: "To the extent that Bullitt had formulated a consistent and harmonious view of the situation in Europe, he permitted it to be dominated by his distrust of the Soviet Union". Convinced that the Soviet Union was the greatest danger to the world, Bullitt favored Franco-German rapprochement as he believed that only the Soviet Union would benefit from another world war. Bullitt did not want to see France dominated by Germany, but felt that a Franco-German rapprochement was both possible and desirable. Bullitt's bête noire was the Soviet Union, and he was strongly opposed to the Franco-Soviet alliance of 1935, which he hoped that the French would renounce. William E. Dodd, the American ambassador in Berlin, accused Bullitt of being "pro-Nazi", though it remains unclear on what grounds that Dodd made that accusation. Bullitt met Hermann Göring several times and mocked him in his reports to Washington for his "German tenor" mannerisms, which he found repulsive. When Göring suggested to Bullitt that Roosevelt should consider the views of five million German-American voters, Bullitt replied that there was "enough trees" in the United States to hang all five million German-Americans if their loyalties to the United States should prove wanting. After a visit to Berlin in 1937, Bullitt reported that the atmosphere in the Auswärtiges Amt was as "cocky as before the war". However, Bullitt still hoped for a Franco-German rapprochement against the Soviet Union and told Bonnet that "such a reconciliation would have the full benediction of the United States". Bullitt had somewhat Anglophobic views and during one of visits to Berlin told Dodd that he cared "not a damn" for Britain. Bullitt distrusted Phipps and held the belief that Phipps had orders from London "to prevent the French from having any tête-à-tête conversations with Germany; the policy of Great Britain is still to keep the Continent of Europe divided...and that little or nothing is to be expected from Great Britain in the way of support of the policy of the reduction of barriers to international commerce and restoration of the economic life of the world". After meeting Dodd several times, Bullitt told Roosevelt that the United States needed a new ambassador in Berlin as "Dodd hates the Nazis too much to be able to do anything with them". In late 1937, Dodd was recalled to the United States and replaced as ambassador to Germany by Hugh Wilson, whom Bullitt approved as a man willing to negotiate with the Nazis. 

In January 1938, Roosevelt launched a plan for an international conference in Washington to be hosted by himself to be attended by diplomats from a number of smaller powers such as Sweden, Hungary, the Netherlands, Belgium, Switzerland, Yugoslavia, and Turkey plus three Latin American nations that he yet to choose. The conference was to discuss ways to end the arms race, access to raw materials (an important point as the 1930s was an era of trade wars and protectionism), international law and the rights of neutral nations. The conclusions of the conference were to be presented to the great powers, which Roosevelt believed would somehow end the possibility of another world war. Through Roosevelt planned to host the conference, he also stated that the United States would continue its "traditional policy of freedom from political involvement". Bullitt advised Roosevelt on 20 January 1938 that his proposed conference was "an escape from reality" that no-one would take seriously. Bullitt wrote: "It would be as if in the palmiest days of Al Capone you had summoned a national conference of psychoanalysts in Washington to discuss the psychological causes of crime". Roosevelt dropped his proposed conference when it became clear that no other world leaders were very interested in the idea. In March 1938, a new government was formed in Paris with Daladier as premier and Bonnet as foreign minister. Bullitt was greatly influenced in his reports by his conversations with both Daladier and Bonnet, and the conflicting opinions he received with Bonnet far more in favor of appeasement than Daladier were reflected in his dispatches.

The Sudetenland crisis
Kaufman described both Kennedy and Bullitt as being more "reporters rather than analysts" whose reports to Washington consisted of "gossip, accounts of conversations with prominent officials in Paris and London, scraps of unassimilated information, rumors, horseback opinions written at the gallop, and predictions". Kennedy had an extremely close friendship with Neville Chamberlain while Bullitt was a very close friend of Daladier, and often the reports of both ambassadors reflected the influence of Chamberlain and Daladier respectively. In May 1938 as the Sudetenland crisis began, Bullitt wrote to Roosevelt that war was not inevitable and predicated that a day would come when the ideological conflicts of the 20th century would seem as "idiotic" to future generations as the wars of religion in the 16th and 17th centuries were now viewed in the 20th century.

On 21 June 1938, Bullitt in "a very private letter that requires no answer" to Roosevelt charged that Bonnet had told him that the Roosevelt administration was about to break American law by shipping 200 war planes to Republican Spain via France. Gracie Hall Roosevelt, the brother of the First Lady Eleanor Roosevelt, then arrived in Paris with the claim that the president was indeed in the process of breaking the arms embargo by shipping 200 American aircraft to the Spanish Republicans. When Bullitt stated he had knew nothing of this plan, Hall Roosevelt stated he had sent from America by the president to tell him. When informed by Bullitt, the State Department had shut down the scheme.  

By the summer of 1938, Bullitt predicated that there was a 50% chance that war would break out in Europe that year. Bullitt put much faith in the mediation mission of Lord Runciman sent to Czechoslovakia to find a peaceful solution to the crisis. Bullitt informed Phipps of his belief that "the last word lies with Lord Runciman, against whom summing up Germany will hardly dare to act".. As was often the case, Bullitt was greatly influenced by the last person he spoke to, and his dispatches varied. On 9 July 1938, Bullitt denounced certain unnamed nations (by which he clearly meant Italy, Japan, and Germany) for having resorted to "the murder of defenseless men, women and children" via the bombing of cities (a reference to the bombings of Ethiopian, Spanish and Chinese cities) and stated that "without international morality as without national morality, there can be no human life worth living". On 2 September 1938, Bullitt told Phipps that "Hitler had invited M. Herriot and M. Piétri to Nuremberg and that he gathered they were accepting the invitation. This seemed to be a slightly more hopeful sign". During the crisis, Bullitt's main fear was that Soviet "agent provocateurs" would stage an incident that would cause a war that he believed Stalin wanted. On 20 May 1938, Bullitt wrote to Roosevelt: "If you believe, as I believe, that it is not in the interest of the United States or civilization as a whole to have the continent of Europe devastated, I think we should attempt to find some way to let the French out of their moral commitment to the Prague government". Bullitt argued that Czechoslovakia was not worth a war as the results would be "the complete destruction of western Europe and Bolshevism from one end of the continent to the other".      

On September 4, 1938, in the midst of the great Sudetenland crisis in Europe that was to culminate in the Munich Agreement on September 30, 1938, during the unveiling of a plaque in France honoring Franco-American friendship, Bullitt stated: "France and the United States were united in war and peace." That led to much speculation in the press that if war broke out over Czechoslovakia, the United States would join the war on the Allied side. On September 9, 1938, however, Roosevelt denied any such intention in a press conference at the White House, saying it was "110% wrong that the United States would join a stop Hitler bloc." The British historian Anthony Adamthwaite noted that Bullitt's Francophilia sometimes got the better of him, and he would make statements about Franco-American friendship that did not reflect the policy of the Roosevelt administration. On 13 September, in a dispatch to the Secretary of State, Cordell Hull, Bullitt stated that a three-power summit to be attended by Chamberlain, Daladier and Hitler was being considered to find a solution to the crisis, and hinted very strongly that Roosevelt should also attend the conference. On 24 September 1938, Bullitt urged Roosevelt to call a conference in the Hague to be attended by all of the leaders of the involved states to find an end to the crisis. The next day, Bullitt urged Roosevelt to attend the proposed conference in the Hague and to mediate the crisis, saying to save the peace the United States must become involved in Europe again.

On 27 September 1938, the French Air Minister, Guy La Chambre, told Bullitt the alarming news that the Armée de l'air had only 600 modern aircraft with the rest obsolete vs. the 6, 500 modern aircraft that the Deuxième Bureau estimated that the Luftwaffe possessed. La Chambre told Bullitt with much emotion that "the German planes will be able to bomb Paris at will" and "the destruction of Paris would pass all imagination". La Chambre asked Bullitt if he could inquire if it were possible for President Roosevelt to by-pass the Neutrality Act and allow the United States to sell France modern aircraft via Canada. La Chambre suggested that American aviation companies open factories in Detroit and Buffalo to manufacture and ship aircraft parts to Canada, where the planes would be assembled and shipped off to France. Bullitt approved of La Chambre's request, and in turn Roosevelt endorsed the plan when Bullitt presented it to him. It was agreed that Jean Monnet, a French civil servant fluent in English and a specialist in economic matters, would go to the United States to make the necessary arrangements. Monnet had just returned from China and got along very well with Bullitt who shared his "creatively intimate picture of China and Japan". On 30 September 1938, the Munich Agreement was signed. Upon hearing the news, Bullitt rushed over to Bonnet's apartment with a bouquet of flowers and tears in his eyes as he told Bonnet: "le salut fraternel et joyeux de 'Amérique".

The aircraft talks
On 3 October 1938 over a luncheon, Daladier told Bullitt: "If I had three or four thousand aircraft Munich would had never had happened". Daladier told Bullitt that he had only signed the Munich Agreement because of the weaknesses in the Armée de l'air, and that he very much wanted to buy modern American aircraft to avoid having to sign treaties like the Munich Agreement again. Bullitt reported that: "Daladier sees the situation entirely, clearly, realizes fully that the meeting in Munich was an immense diplomatic defeat for France and England, and recognizes that unless France can recover an united national spirt to confront the future, a fatal situation will arise within a year". On 13 October 1938, Bullitt visited Washington to meet Roosevelt to inform the president about the grave weaknesses in the Armée de l'air. Roosevelt had been unaware that most of the aircraft of the Armée de l'air were antiquated and obsolete aircraft that would have been no match for the modern aircraft of the Luftwaffe, and found Bullitt's reports about the problems in the French aviation industry most worrisome. About his change from a supporter of appeasement to an opponent of appeasement, Kaufman wrote: "It is probably true that Bullitt lacked any studied and reasoned conception of international politics...But intuition, intelligence and wide experience enabled him to see clearly after the rude shock of Munich...The threat to his beloved France now stood forth in stark and ominous outline; a great many of his influential acquaintances were turning their backs on appeasement; the days of illusion had passed". Bullitt advised Roosevelt that Britain and France were "America's first line of defense" and told him that the United States must make its industrial capacity available to both states as he stated that it was the only way to save the peace in Europe. At a dinner in Washington on 22 October 1938 attended by Roosevelt, Bullitt, Monnet and the Treasury Secretary Henry Morgenthau, the latter objected to the plans for the French to buy American aircraft. Morgenthau  stated that France was a "bankrupt, fourth-rate power" and told Monnet bluntly that according to his information that the French treasury lacked the sum of francs equal to $85 million U.S. dollars needed to buy the 1, 700 aircraft that Monnet indicated the Armée de l'air needed. Bullitt and Morgenthau devised a scheme that the French government seize the assets of French citizens in American banks to raise the necessary money.     

On 14 November 1938, Bullitt was present at a meeting at the White House where Roosevelt announced a secret plan to deter Germany from war by supplying American aircraft on a gargantuan scale to Great Britain and especially France. During the meeting, Bullitt stated: "The moral is: if you have enough airplanes you don't have to go to Berchtesgaden". Roosevelt concluded: "Had we had this summer 5, 000 planes and the capacity immediately to produce 10, 000 per year, even though I would have to ask Congress for the authority to sell or lend to the countries in Europe, Hitler would not have dared to take the stand he did". Roosevelt took up the suggestion that the aviation factories be located near the Canadian border to have the aircraft assembled in Canada should a war break out in Europe and the Neutrality Act come into force. On 9 December 1938, the Comité Permanent de la Défense Nationale chaired by Daladier approved of the plan to sent Monnet back to the United States to place an order with American companies for some 1, 000 American aircraft to be delivered to France no later than by July 1939. On 4 January 1939, in a speech to Congress, Roosevelt repeated his usual nostrums about his hopes for peace, but hinted that should a war begin in Europe that the United States should provide material support to Britain and France. Daladier had committed a sum of francs equal to some $65 million U.S. dollars for the first shipment of plans, but the question of how France was to pay for aircraft remained. Monnet planned for France to create a corporation in Canada that would borrow the money for more aircraft orders, leading to Morgenthau to crossly point out the Johnson act of 1934 forbade loans to nations that defaulted on their World War One debts as the French had done in 1932. On 13 February 1939, Bullitt met with Daladier and the Finance Minister, Paul Reynaud, who wanted to use private credits from American banks to pay for more aircraft in an attempt to circumvent the Johnson act, which Bullitt vetoed. Both Daladier and Reynauld apologized to Bullitt for the default of 1932, saying it was an "extremely stupid" thing to have done, but argued that France needed loans to buy more American aircraft immediately. Daladier offered to Bullitt to turn all of the islands of the French West Indies and the French Pacific islands to the United States in exchange for the Johnson act being repealed.

The Danzig crisis
During the Danzig crisis, despite his hatred of the Soviet Union, Bullitt tentatively supported the idea of a "peace front" of the United Kingdom, France and the Soviet Union to deter Germany from invading Poland. Bullitt reported to Roosevelt that Stalin was not to be trusted, but that he agreed with Daladier's statement that "no stone should be left unturned, even though one might expect to find vermin under it". At a meeting on 4 April 1939 attended by Daladier, Reynaud, Monnet and Bullitt, Daladier stated he had the power to govern via degree and that "he did not care how many islands it might be necessary to turn to the United States if only the question could be settled". Bullitt reported that both Daladier and Reynaud were "anxious to act quickly" before the Danzig crisis turned into a war. On 11 April 1939, the British Foreign Secretary Lord Halifax wrote to Roosevelt to request that he move much of the warships of the U.S. Atlantic fleet to the Pacific Fleet to dissuade the Japanese from taking advantage of the Danzig crisis, a request that Roosevelt had refused. Acting on the knowledge that the British would be more involved in Europe if the Americans were more involved in Asia, St. Léger told Bullitt that the Deuxième Bureau had discovered a secret German-Japanese plan that Japan would attack the British and French colonies in Asia the moment Germany invaded Poland. Prying on popular American stereotypes of Britain in general and the Chamberlain government in particular, St. Léger claimed to Bullitt that pressure from the City had led Chamberlain to decide to send the main part of the Royal Navy to Singapore (the major British naval base in Asia) and accordingly the Danzig crisis was more likely to end in war. Bullitt accepted St. Léger's claims and reported them as fact  to Roosevelt, who reversed himself and ordered much of the U.S. Atlantic fleet transferred over the Pacific fleet. In fact, all of St. Léger's claims were false and were intended to have the Americans more involved in the Asia-Pacific region to keep the British engaged in the Danzig crisis. 

In April 1939, Bullitt advised Roosevelt that he should denounce Hitler for violating the Munich Agreement by occupying the Czech half of Czecho-Slovakia and the Memelland. Bullitt further advised the president that he must ask Congress to repeal the Neutrality Acts. Bullitt noted that Germany had the world's 2nd largest economy and that the Neutrality Acts in practice favored the Reich by depriving Germany's potential enemies of American arms. Bullitt warned Roosevelt that he must tell the American people that "the acceptance of war is a less horrible alternative than the acceptance of slavery". Much to Bullitt's annoyance, Roosevelt instead on 15 April 1939 sent out a public message to Hitler asking him not to threaten other states.  

On 28 April 1939, Hitler gave a speech before the Reichstag that was a reply to Roosevelt's request, which he ridiculed mercilessly by reading out statements from 34 different governments that they did not feel threatened by the Reich. After Hitler's speech, St. Léger met with Bullitt to tell him that Hitler's response to Roosevelt's request to not threaten his neighbors was to renounce in his speech the 1934 German-Polish non-aggression pact and for the first time in public lay claim to the Free City of Danzig.  St. Léger expressed the view that Hitler was probably planning to invade Poland based on his speech.. Bullitt reported with astonishment the claim by Phipps who had told him that Hitler's speech opened the door for a peaceful resolution of the Danzig crisis. Bullitt also reported that Daladier had told him that the arch-appeaser Phipps-who was very close to Bonnet-was a "dangerous" man who should not be serving as the British ambassador in Paris. On 4 May 1939, Maxim Litvinov, the longtime Soviet Foreign Commissar and an advocate of collective security was sacked and replaced with Vyacheslav Molotov. Bullitt saw no great significance to Litvinov's firing, which he attributed to a power struggle within the Politburo, writing to Roosevelt that the "anti-Jewish" members of the Politburo such as Andrei Zhdanov, Vyacheslav Molotov, and Andrey Andreyev had "all desired to take foreign policy out of the hands of the Jews. Litvinov's failure to reach an agreement with England offered an excellent opportunity to get rid of Litvinov and his intimate Jewish collaborators".    

In 1939, Premier Daladier informed him that French intelligence knew that Alger Hiss in the United States Department of State was working for Soviet intelligence. Bullitt passed the information along to Hiss's superior at the State Department. On 28 June 1939, Daladier told Bullitt that  the only way to prevent the Danzig crisis from turning into a war was creating the "peace front" as soon as possible and for Congress to repeal the Neutrality acts as he maintained that otherwise Germany would invade Poland sometime that year. In  another meeting with St. Léger on the same day, the secretary-general told Bullitt that "there were eighty chances in a hundred" of the Anglo-French-Soviet negotiations  "would be successfully concluded in the near-future". On 30 June 1939, St. Léger told Bullitt that his only hopes for stopping the Danzig crisis from turning into a war were a French alliance with the Soviet Union and for the United States to generously provide aid to France, especially in the form of modern aircraft. On 8 August 1939, Bullitt wrote to R. Walton Moore: "The action of Congress on the Neutrality Act is sickening. The fact is, if war starts and France and England do not get any supplies from the United States, they will be defeated. As a result, Hitler has been encouraged greatly to act this summer".

World War Two
On the morning of 1 September 1939, Bullitt was the first to inform Roosevelt that war had broken out in Europe. As Roosevelt was sleeping at about 3: 00 am, he was awoken by a phone call from Bullitt in Paris (where the time was about 11 am) who told him: "Mr. President, several German divisions are deep in Polish territory...There are reports of bombers over the city of Warsaw". Roosevelt replied: "Well, Bill, it has come at last. God help us all!" Roosevelt delayed recognition that war had begun in Europe until 5 September 1939 to allow war material that the British and the French had paid for to be loaded onto ships in American ports. After finally according recognition that war had broken out, the Neutrality Act came into force, which placed a total embargo on the United States selling or shipping "all arms, ammunition or implements of war", which included "aircraft, unassembled, assembled or dismantled" plus all "propellers or air screws, fuselages, hulls, wings, tail units and aircraft engines". Bullitt reported from Paris: "It is, of course, obvious that if the Neutrality Act remains in its present form, France and England will be defeated rapidly". 

During the drôle de guerre, Bullitt took a pessimistic line as he warned that most of the aircraft in the Armée de l'air were obsolete, and that as Roosevelt's plans to sell modern American aircraft to France had become stymied by opposition in Congress, that he felt that France was destined to be defeated. Bullitt informed Roosevelt that Maurice Gamelin was very confident that France would not be defeated, but that he did not share his confidence. Bullitt reported that a tour of the Maginot line and the disorganized state of French supplies left him profoundly depressed about the future of France. Bullitt advised the officials of the Quai d'Orsay of loopholes in the Neutrality Acts while urging Roosevelt that he must do more to persuade Congress to revise the Neutrality Acts in a pro-Allied direction.  Bullitt was greatly angered by the Soviet invasion of Finland on 30 November 1939, and urged that the matter be raised at the Assembly of the League of Nations in Geneva. When the League voted to expel the Soviet Union for aggression against Finland, Bullitt was exuberant. Roosevelt persuaded Congress to revise the Neutrality acts to permit the sale of American aircraft to France on 3 November 1939. In early December 1939, an Anglo-French Co-ordinating Committee whose chairman was Monnet was created to buy American aircraft. Monnet sent René Pleven to the United States to place the orders. On 10 April 1940, Pleven signed contracts for France to buy 2, 400 fighters and 2, 100 bombers with the first deliveries to be made in September 1940. Of the 500 American aircraft purchased by the French in 1938-1939, only 200 Curtis P-36 Hawk fighters had been delivered to France by September 1939. 

On 10 May 1940, the Wehrmacht launched Fall Gelb (Case Yellow) and by 16 May 1940 had won the Second Battle of Sedan. After the German broke through the French lines along the Meuse river, Bullitt became desperate in his dispatches to Washington as he wrote the French immediately needed more American aircraft. In a desperate gesture, Bullitt advised Roosevelt to send the U.S. Atlantic fleet on a tour of Greece, Portugal and the international free city of Tangier in a bid to deter Italy from entering the war on the Axis side. Bullitt reported to Roosevelt that the panzers had pushed their way past anti-tank obstacles along the Meuse "as if they did not exist". Welles complained about the "something fantastic" quality of Bullitt's dispatches from Paris as he grew increasingly hysterical though May-June 1940. On 18 May 1940, St. Léger told Bullitt that Reynaud who was now serving as premier planned to ask Roosevelt to have the United States declare war on Germany. On 31 May 1940, Reynaud made the request while the same day Bullitt asked for the American Atlantic fleet to be sent to Algeria to keep Italy out of the war. Bullitt suggested that in May 1940 "that nothing would have a greater restraining influence on Mussolini than a genuine fear that the Pope might leave Rome and take refuge in a neutral country". On 29 May 1940, Bullitt in a message to Roosevelt stated: "Al Capone [Mussolini] will enter the war about forth of June, unless you throw the fear of the U.S.A. into him. About U.S. opinion I know nothing, but the only hope in my opinion is for the rest of the Atlantic fleet to follow". Kaufman noted that for Bullitt the defeat of France was a "personal tragedy" as France was a second homeland to him, the country he loved as almost as much as his own. On 19 June 1940, Italy declared war on France. Reynaud told Bullitt the same day: "What really distinguished, noble and admirable people the Italians are, to stab us in the back at this moment". Roosevelt used Reynauld's remark in a speech on American radio, where he accused Italy of having "stabbed" France in the back. Bullitt had part of the gold reserves of the Banque de France sent to New York; asked and received a promise from Reynauld that the French fleet would not be handed over to Germany; and finally was forced to tell Reynaud that the United States would not declare war on Germany or even provide France with the "clouds of planes" he urgently requested. Bullitt blamed the French defeat on Britain as he accused the British prime minister Winston Churchill of not sending enough Royal Air Force squadrons to France and accused Churchill of seeking to preserve the RAF and the Royal Navy in order to improve the British bargaining position to make peace with Germany once France was defeated. 

Bullitt fell out with Roosevelt; they never reconciled. Bullitt insisted on remaining in Paris as the only ambassador of a major nation left when the Germans marched in on 14 June 1940. Bullitt argued that: "No American ambassador in Paris has ever run away from anything". That angered Roosevelt, who believed Bullitt should have followed the French government to Bordeaux to look after US interests. The French cabinet was divided between those who wanted to sign an armistice with Germany vs. those who felt that French government should relocate to Algiers (at the time Algeria was considered an integral part of France) to continue the war. Roosevelt believed that if Bullitt had been present in Bordeaux, he could had used his influence to press for continuing the war from Algeria.  Once thought of as a potential cabinet member, he now found his career blocked. In a sign of presidential disfavor, Roosevelt appointed a new American ambassador to France (the United States recognized the Vichy government until November 1942), Admiral William D. Leahy..

Campaign against Sumner Welles
In the late 1930s, the US State Department was divided by rivalry between Secretary of State Cordell Hull and Undersecretary Sumner Welles, who was Roosevelt's favorite. Bullitt, who disliked Welles, was allied with Hull and Department Counselor R. Walton Moore. 

In September 1940, a drunken Welles propositioned two male railroad porters. Bullitt learned of the incident through Moore, who, at his death, passed affidavits to Bullitt that were sworn by the porters who had been propositioned. Bullitt used that information to campaign for Welles's resignation. Roosevelt long resisted taking any action against Welles. Elliott Roosevelt later wrote that his father believed that Bullitt had bribed the porters to make overtures to Welles to entrap him. Bullitt was normally tolerant of homosexuality, but he chose to make an issue of the incident with the porters as a way to destroy the career of Welles, a man he greatly hated and whose job he had long desired.

On April 23, 1941, Bullitt confronted Roosevelt with his evidence, but Roosevelt refused to yield to Bullitt's demands and dismissed him from any further significant duties with the State Department. At one point, he suggested to Hull that Bullitt should be appointed ambassador to Liberia, one of the worst postings in the Foreign Service. In 1942, Bullitt pushed the story to Vice President Henry A. Wallace and to Hull. Roosevelt told Wallace that Bullitt ought to "burn in hell" for what he was saying about Welles. In early 1943, Hull began to demand Welles' removal. Bullitt now informed Senator Owen Brewster, a Republican, a strong opponent of Roosevelt. Brewster threatened a senatorial inquiry. The potential scandal finally forced Roosevelt to act, and on September 30, 1943, Welles resigned. Roosevelt remained very angry with Bullitt and refused to give him any other government post.

Second World War
Denied a commission in the US Armed Forces by Roosevelt, Bullitt joined the Free French Forces. Bullitt declared in a letter: "I speak French almost as easily as I speak English, and have had many experience in maintaining the most friendly relations with French civilians and military men in difficult hours. Could I serve as a liaison with the French forces?...The fight to drive the Germans out of France is my fight to a peculiar degree. I profoundly want to get into activity...Cannot the Army use me?" Roosevelt suggested to Bullitt to run for Mayor of Philadelphia as a Democrat in 1943, but Roosevelt secretly told the Democratic leaders there, "Cut his throat." Bullitt was defeated. 

As the war went on, Bullitt grew obsessed with the fear that the inability of the Anglo-American forces to open up a Second Front in western Europe would lead to Soviet domination of Europe. In 1943, Bullitt in a letter to Roosevelt stated that Stalin wanted his forces "as far west as the Rhine, perhaps even beyond" as he predicated that Soviet forces would impose Communists regimes on any area that they occupied. Bullitt favored opening a Second Front in north-west Europe as soon as possible in order to push Anglo-American forces as far as east as possible, and was greatly annoyed at the British delaying tactics to a second front as Churchill favored focusing on the Mediterrean theater instead.. In 1945, Bullitt was greatly alarmed by the popularity of the French Communist party, which he believed was turning France into a Communist dictatorship after the liberation as he complained that French Communists occupied too many posts in the government, and put his hopes into  de Gaulle as France's "savior" from Communism.

The Cold War
Between 1941 and 1945, Bullitt wrote volumes of stories and social commentary on the dangers of fascism and communism. In the postwar years, he became a militant anticommunist. At the same time, he also believed that extending the 1919 Bullitt Commission and the negotiations with Lenin would have been constructive. Bullitt became a militant critic of the foreign policy of the Roosevelt administration, which he described as soft on communism. In his article "How We Won The War and Lost the Peace" in Life, Bullitt criticized Roosevelt's foreign policy towards the Soviet Union as one of endless blunders and concluded: "Russia will be able to mobilize the manpower and industrial strength of China and Japan for its ultimate assault on the United States".

Moving increasingly to the right, Bullitt attached himself to the China Lobby, which favored the support of the Kuomintang regime. In 1947, Henry Luce hired Bullitt for some $13, 000 dollars to work as the "special correspondent" of Life on China. Bullitt was then sent off on a tour of China to report on the war. On 13 October 1947, Life published an article by Bullitt entitled "Report on China" that began with question posed in capital letters: "CAN CHINA BE KEPT OUT OF THE HANDS OF STALIN?" Bullitt advocated American support for the Kuomintang, who were losing the Chinese civil war to the Chinese Communists as he wrote: "If China falls into the hands of Stalin, all of Asia including Japan will sooner or later fall into his hands". Bullitt advocated that the United States provide the Republic of China with some $1.35 billion dollars in aid with some $75 million to go for the stabilization of the inflation-weakened Chinese dollar immediately; another $75 million for further stabilization of the Chinese economy over the next three years; and some $600 million for the modernization of the National Revolutionary Army. Finally, Bullitt advocated that the United States pay for and train some 10 new divisions of the National Revolutionary Army, which would lead an offensive to retake Manchuria, which had lost to the Communist People's Liberation Army earlier that year. Manchuria, a region with some 34 million people was known as the industrial heartland of China, a center of heavy industry, and its loss to the Communists alongside the best divisions of the National Revolutionary Army that had sent to hold it had been major blows to the Kuomintang regime. The media mogul Luce ensured that Bullitt's "Report on China" was given widespread publicity. 

Though Bullitt did not speak Mandarin, the Republican-controlled Congress had Bullitt testify as an expert witness on China that the policies of the Truman administration would lead to the "loss" of China. Bullitt testified: "The independence of the U.S. will not last a generation longer than the independence of China". As the resident Asia expert for the Luce media empire, another article by Bullitt was published in Life in December 1947, this time on the war in French Indochina. Bullitt admitted that much of the Vietnamese population wanted independence from France, and called Ho Chi Minh an "intelligent, completely selfless man endowed with great personal charm". However, Bullitt advocated that Vietnam be granted independence within the French Union and he wrote that the victory of the Viet Minh would replace "the yoke of France by the terrible yoke of Stalin". Bullitt advocated greater American involvement in south-east Asia to preserve French Indochina and testified before the Senate Foreign Relations Committee that if France failed in Vietnam, "the U.S. should perhaps take a hand in the matter". In 1948, Bullitt left the Democratic Party and joined the Republican party. Bullitt expected the Republican candidate, Governor Thomas E. Dewey of New York, to win the election and wanted a senior post related to foreign policy in the expected Dewey administration. 

In the August 24, 1954, issue of Look, in his article "Should We Support an Attack on Red China?", he proposed an immediate attack on Communist China and asserted that the United States should "reply to the next Communist aggression by dropping bombs on the Soviet Union."  In 1964, Bullitt broke with de Gaulle when France recognized the People's Republic of China as the legitimate government of China, which greatly angered him. 

The biography of Wilson that was co-written by Bullitt and Freud in the 1920s was published in 1966. It argued that Wilson resolved his Oedipus complex by becoming highly neurotic, casting his father as God and himself as Christ, the savior of mankind, which ruined the Versailles Treaty. The thesis put forward by Bullit and Freud was that Wilson during the Paris peace conference had suffered an "extraordinary mental disintegration" caused by his issues with his overbearing father, the Presbyterian preacher Thomas Wilson. Freud and Bullitt claimed that Wilson had envisioned his principle domestic opponent, the Republican senator Henry Cabot Lodge, as a "father representative" and thus could not compromise with Lodge as it brought back too many negative memories of his submission as a boy to his father. The co-authors argued that Wilson was delusional in 1919 as his mind was in a "wild flight from fact". Bullitt and Freud claimed that Wilson, a deeply religious man whose values were powerfully shaped by his Calvinist upbringing, chose to cast himself as a Christ figure who sacrificed himself as "the Savior of the World".  The book received a reception that was almost unanimously hostile. The historian A. J. P. Taylor called it a "disgrace" and asked, "How did anyone ever manage to take Freud seriously?" The American historian Lloyd Ambrosius wrote the key assumptions made by Freud and Bullitt, namely that the Treaty of Versailles was a mockery of the 14 Points and that Wilson could have if had wanted to, forced the other leaders at the Paris peace conference to accept his vision of the peace, were both wrong.

Bullitt died in Neuilly-sur-Seine, France, on February 15, 1967, and is buried in Woodlands Cemetery in Philadelphia.

Works

Books:
Foreign policy
 The Bullitt Mission to Russia (New York: Huebsch, 1919)
 The Great Globe Itself (New York: Scribner's, 1946)
Biography
 Thomas Woodrow Wilson: A Psychological Study (Boston: Houghton Mifflin 1967), with Sigmund Freud
Novel
 It's Not Done (New York: Harcourt Brace, 1926)

Articles:
 "How We Won the War and Lost the Peace" Part I, Life (August 30, 1948)
 "How We Won the War and Lost the Peace" Part II, Life (September 6, 1948)

See also

Carmel Offie, secretary to Bullit

Notes

Further reading

Alexander, Martin S. "Safes and houses: William C. Bullitt, embassy security and the shortcomings of the US foreign service in Europe before the second world war." Diplomacy and Statecraft 2.2 (1991): 187-210.

 Campbell, J. F. " 'To Bury Freud on Wilson': Uncovering Thomas Woodrow Wilson, A Psychological Study, by Sigmund Freud and William C. Bullitt." Modern Austrian Literature 41.2 (2008) pp 41–56 Online
 Cassella-Blackburn, Michael. The Donkey, the Carrot, and the Club: William C. Bullitt and Soviet-American relations, 1917-1948. (Greenwood, 2004). Online

 Farnsworth, Beatrice. William C. Bullitt and the Soviet Union (Indiana UP, 1967).

 McKean, David. Watching Darkness Fall: FDR, His Ambassadors, and the Rise of Adolf Hitler. (St. Martin's Press, 2017). 

 Thayer, Charles Wheeler, Bears in the Caviar (NY: Lippincott, 1951)

 Weisbrode, Kenneth. "The Unruly Spirit: William Bullitt 1936-1940," in Diplomats at War: The American Experience, eds. J. Simon Rofe and Andrew Stewart (Republic of Letters, 2013) .
 Whitman, Alden, "Energetic Diplomat; William C. Bullitt, First U.S. Envoy to Soviet, Dies," obituary in the New York Times, February 16, 1967 available online

Primary sources
 Bullitt, Orville (brother of William C. Bullitt) For the President: Personal and Secret. Correspondence Between Franklin D. Roosevelt and William C. Bullitt (1972).
 Bullitt, William Christian. "The Bullitt Mission to Russia: Testimony Before the Committee on Foreign Relations, United States Senate" (1919).  Online also online 
 Bullitt, William Christian. The Great Globe Itself: a Preface to World Affairs (Transaction Publishers, 1946). Online

External links

 
 
 William C. Bullitt: Diplomat and Prophet —Documents Bullitt's opposition to the Nazis throughout the 1930s and the period leading up to the war.
 Correspondence at the Franklin D. Roosevelt Presidential Library and Museum
 William C. Bullitt Papers (MS 112). Manuscripts and Archives, Yale University Library.
 

1891 births
1967 deaths
Harvard Law School alumni
Writers from Philadelphia
Ambassadors of the United States to France
Writers about the Soviet Union
Ambassadors of the United States to the Soviet Union
20th-century American diplomats
William
Analysands of Sigmund Freud
Pennsylvania Democrats
Burials at The Woodlands Cemetery
American anti-communists
Pennsylvania Republicans